Edward Walton may refer to:

 Edward Arthur Walton (1860–1922), Scottish painter
 Edward Walton (serial killer) (died 1908), American serial killer
 Ted Walton (born 1949), Australian rugby league player